Sean Michael White (born November 10, 1995) is an American football quarterback who formerly played for the Auburn Tigers. White ranks third in Auburn history for career passing efficiency and fourth in completion percentage.

Early years
White attended Chaminade-Madonna College Preparatory School in Hollywood, Florida for his first 3 years of high school before transferring to University School of Nova Southeastern University in Fort Lauderdale, Florida for his senior year. White finished his high school career with over 8,300 yards and 107 total TDS. The summer before his senior season, White won the Elite 11 QB competition, despite several future NFL starters attending such as Deshaun Watson, Kyle Allen, DeShone Kizer, and Will Grier. He passed for 2,679 yards and 30 touchdowns as a senior, earning 1st-Team All Broward County honors. He was the MVP of the 2014 Under Armour All-America Game after completing 10 of 12 passes for 156 yards with a touchdown. White was rated as a four-star recruit by Rivals.com and was ranked among the top quarterbacks in his class. He committed to Auburn University to play college football.

College career
White redshirted his first year at Auburn in 2014. He started his redshirt freshman year in 2015 as the backup to Jeremy Johnson. After three games, Johnson was benched and White was named the starter. White started his first college game vs Mississippi State. White started a total of six games in 2015. White became the first freshman QB in Auburn history to throw for 250 or more yards in three straight games, doing so against Kentucky, Arkansas, and Ole Miss. An injury to left knee and foot caused White to miss the final games of the season. White finished the year with 1,167 passing yards, one touchdown pass against four interceptions, and a 58 percent completion percentage.

In 2016, White battled Jeremy Johnson and John Franklin III for the starting quarterback job. On August 25, 2016, White was named the starting quarterback by head coach Gus Malzahn. White played in eleven games, including a run into the Top 10 for Auburn (#9), winning six straight games to reach 7–2. White had the #3 completion pct in the FBS heading into Athens to face Georgia. A shoulder injury early derailed that game and subsequently the season. White returned to play in the Sugar Bowl against Baker Mayfield and Oklahoma, until a broken arm caused White to be replaced in the second quarter. White finished 2016 with 1,679 passing yards, 9 touchdowns, 3 interceptions, and a 63.9 completion percentage. 

In 2017, White, injured for all of Spring practice, lost the position of starting quarterback to Baylor transfer Jarrett Stidham.

On September 18, 2017, White was dismissed from the team following a public intoxication arrest.

Statistics

Controversy
White was arrested and charged with public intoxication shortly before 3 a.m. on Homecoming Night, September 17, 2017. Auburn head coach Gus Malzahn dismissed White from the team the next day, stating: "He has made poor decisions that are not in the best interest of our program, and more importantly, himself." In February 2018, a municipal court judge in the city of Auburn dismissed the public intoxication charge against White.

Personal life
After leaving Auburn, White was left with several injuries and despite several offers to join other programs, he decided to retire from football and obtain his finance degree from Florida International University. He graduated magna cum laude, and currently resides in Boston, MA.

References

External links
Auburn Tigers bio

1995 births
Living people
Sportspeople from Boca Raton, Florida
Players of American football from Florida
American football quarterbacks
Auburn Tigers football players